Longimanus may refer to:

 Oceanic whitetip shark (Carcharhinus longimanus), a tropical and warm temperate seas shark
 Artaxerxes I of Persia, who was surnamed in Greek as μακρόχειρ Macrocheir or Longimanus in Latin.